Arshad Shamim is a Singaporean footballer who plays as a midfielder for Young Lions.

Club career
Arshad burst onto the scene earlier this season as he marked his league debut on 22 April against Geylang International FC, playing the full 90 minutes in a 4-1 victory.

International career
Arshad was named in the 24-man squad for a training camp in Japan ahead of the Asian Football Confederation (AFC) Under-23 Championship qualifiers in March 2019.

Career statistics

Club

Notes

International

U23 International caps

U19 International caps

References

Living people
Malaysian footballers
Singapore Premier League players
Home United FC players
1999 births
Association football midfielders
Lion City Sailors FC players
Competitors at the 2021 Southeast Asian Games
Southeast Asian Games competitors for Singapore